Cable Television Laboratories, Inc. (CableLabs) is a nonprofit corporation promoting innovation as a research and development lab founded in 1988 by American cable operators. System operators from around the world are eligible to be members.

The DOCSIS standard for cable Internet access was originally developed by CableLabs and contributing companies, including Arris, BigBand Networks, Broadcom, Cisco, Comcast, Conexant, Correlant, Cox, Harmonic, Intel, Motorola, Netgear, Terayon, Time Warner Cable, and Texas Instruments.

See also

References

External links 
 
 CableLabs Specifications Database

Organizations established in 1988
1988 establishments in Colorado
Organizations based in Denver
Boulder County, Colorado
Cable television in the United States
Intelligent Community Forum
Non-profit organizations based in the United States